Gaeru of Baekje (died 166, r. 128–166) was the fourth king of Baekje, one of the Three Kingdoms of Korea.

Background
According to the history compilation Samguk Sagi, he was the son of the previous king Giru. He became king upon Giru's death in 128 which was the 52nd year of his reign. The Samguk Sagi records that "his character was respectful and also orderly in his conduct".

Reign
In 132, he founded Bukhansanseong in present-day Goyang city, Gyeonggi, South Korea. Baekje fought off many Goguryeo (the northern Korean kingdom) invasions from this fortress, and the 5th king Chogo based his northward campaign on it. Baekje's relationship with the southeastern rival Silla was peaceful for most of his period of reign. However, in 145, a Silla minister named Gilseon (길선/吉宣) failed his coup d'etat attempt and fled to Baekje. Gaeru gave him refuge despite the Silla king Adalla's written request for his return. Silla subsequently attacked Baekje, and a broad war over the Sobaek Mountains ensued.

Samguk Sagi:
 131 AD, summer, fourth month. The king went hunting at Mt. Han.
 132 AD, spring, second month. The fortress of Mt. Bukhan (Bukhansanseong) was constructed.
 137 AD, autumn, eighth month. Mars moved into the Southern Dipper.
 145 AD, spring, first month, last day of the month. There was a solar eclipse. Winter, tenth month. Ajan Gilseon of Silla made a treasonous plot but it was discovered and he came to our country. The king of Silla sent a written request for him but he was not sent back. The king of Silla was furious and led soldiers out and came to attack. All the fortresses were fortified and defended themselves, and he could not get in. The Sillan soldiers used all their stores and returned.

During the Spring and Autumn Period, when Pu of Chu fled to Lu, Ji Wenzi said, "Seeing one who conducts himself properly toward his lord is like seeing a child who is filial to its father and mother. Upon seeing one who is not proper to his lord, he should be killed like a hawk on a sparrow. Seeing Pu of Chu, [he said that] he has no measure of virtue and had murderous ethics, and this passed. Now Gilseon was also a wicked and rebellious man, and the king of Baekje took him in and hid him. Thus we can say that concealing a villain makes one a harborer. Therefore, the peace was lost with neighboring countries, and the king made his people suffer under the burden of attack. This lacked insight.

Legacy
The Samguk Sagi states that Gaeru's eldest son became the 5th king Chogo and the second son became the 8th king Goi. This chronological inconsistency is thought to indicate a power struggle between two royal lines.  The 21st king Gaero (also known as Geungaeru) apparently took Gaeru's name to assert the legitimacy of this.

Family
 Father: Giru of Baekje
 Mother: unknown
 Brother: Buyeo Jil (扶餘質, ?–?) – in April, 242 he was appointed as the official Woo-bo (右輔), prime minister.
 Queen(s): unknown
 1st son: 5th King, Chogo of Baekje (肖古王, ?–214) – before he became king he was known as Buyeo Chogo (扶餘肖古).
 2nd son: 8th King, Goi of Baekje (古爾王, ?–286) – before he became king he was known as Buyeo Goi (扶餘古爾).
 3rd son: Buyeo Usu (扶餘優壽, ?–?) – the only record of him is in the Samguk Sagi in 260 when he was appointed Minister of the Interior (內臣佐平, Naesin-jwa'pyeong).

See also
List of monarchs of Korea
History of Korea

References
  Content in this article was copied from Samguk Sagi Scroll 23 at the Shoki Wiki, which is licensed under the Creative Commons Attribution-Share Alike 3.0 (Unported) (CC-BY-SA 3.0) license.
The Academy of Korean Studies
Doosan Encyclopedia

166 deaths
Baekje rulers
2nd-century monarchs in Asia
Year of birth unknown
2nd-century Korean people